The Royal Mail Steam Packet Company was a British shipping company founded in London in 1839 by a Scot, James MacQueen. The line's motto was Per Mare Ubique (everywhere by sea). After a troubled start, it became the largest shipping group in the world in 1927 when it took over the White Star Line. 
The company was liquidated and its assets taken over by the newly formed Royal Mail Lines in 1932 after financial trouble and scandal; over the years RML declined to no more than the name of a service run by former rival Hamburg Süd.

History as Royal Mail Steam Packet Company
The RMSPC, founded in 1839 by James MacQueen, ran tours and mail to various destinations in the Caribbean and South America, and by 1927, was the largest shipping group in the world. MacQueen’s imperial visions for the RMSPC were clear; he hoped that new steamship communications between Britain and the Caribbean would mitigate post-Emancipation instabilities, in particular by promoting commerce. From the outset the company aimed to be the vanguard of British maritime supremacy and technology, as F. Harcourt suggests, the RMSPC presented itself "as existing not merely for the good of its shareholders but for the good of the nation". The high hopes for the business were boosted by the government’s mail contract subsidy, worth £240,000 a year. The RMSPC evolved vastly from 1839 to the beginning of the 20th century. It introduced new technologies, such as John Elder’s marine compound steam engine in 1870, and worked to redefine seafaring by focusing on comfort and passenger requirements.

In January 1903 Owen Philipps was elected to the RMSP's Court of Directors, and that March he was elected Chairman. Under Philipps, RMSP grew by acquiring controlling interests in multiple companies. Philipps was knighted in 1909 and ennobled as Baron Kylsant in 1923. However, poor economic circumstances and controversy surrounding a deception by Philipps meant that the RMSPC collapsed in 1930, after which various constituent companies were sold off. In 1932, its successor, the Royal Mail Lines (RML) was formed, continuing the memory and operations of the RMSPC.

Queen Victoria granted the initial Royal Charter of Incorporation of "The Royal Mail Steam Packet Company" on 26 September 1839. In 1840 the Admiralty and the Royal Mail Steam Packet Company made a contract in which the latter agreed to provide a fleet of not fewer than 14 steam ships for the purpose of carrying all Her Majesty's mails, to sail twice every month to Barbados in the West Indies from Southampton or Falmouth. Fourteen new steam ships were built for the purpose: Thames, Medway, and Isis (built at Northfleet); Severn and Avon (built at Bristol); Tweed, Clyde, Teviot, Dee, and Solway (built at Greenock); Tay (built at Dumbarton); Forth (built at Leith); and Medina, (built at Cowes). In reference to their destination, these ships were known as the West Indies Mail Steamers.

The West Indian Mail Service was established by the sailing of the first Royal Mail Steam Packet, PS Thames from Falmouth on 1 January 1841. A Supplemental Royal Charter was granted on 30 August 1851 extending the sphere of the Company's operations. In 1864, the mail service to the British Honduras was established. A further Supplemental Royal Charter was granted extending the sphere of the Company's operations on 7 March 1882.

Philipps modernised RMSP's fleet in the decade before the First World War. All three were built in Belfast; two by Harland & Wolff. That October, Philipps ordered three smaller cargo ships for RMSP's Caribbean service, Conway, Caroni and Catalina, from Armstrong Whitworth on Tyneside. Then in November he impressed upon his fellow-Directors the need for new and larger ocean liners for the mail contract between Britain and the River Plate.

Each had a name beginning with the letter "A", so collectively they were called the "A-liners" or the "A-series". Earlier members of the series, from Aragon to Asturias, had twin screws, each driven by a four-cylinder quadruple-expansion steam engine. The final four members of the series, from Arlanza to Almanzora, were significantly larger than the earlier five. They had triple screws, with the middle one driven by a low pressure Parsons steam turbine.

After the First World War RMSP faced not only existing foreign competition but a new UK challenger. Lord Vestey's Blue Star Line had joined the South American route and won a large share of the frozen meat trade. Then in 1926–27 Blue Star introduced its new "luxury five" ships Almeda, Andalucia, Arandora, Avelona and Avila to both increase refrigerated cargo capacity and enter the passenger trade. Although these were the biggest and most luxurious UK ships on the route, RMSP Chairman Lord Kylsant called Blue Star's quintet "very keen competition".

Reconstitution as Royal Mail Lines

The company ran into financial trouble, and the UK Government investigated its affairs in 1930, resulting in the Royal Mail Case. In 1931 Lord Kylsant was jailed for 12 months for misrepresenting the state of the company to shareholders. So much of Britain's shipping industry was involved in RMSPC that arrangements were made to guarantee the continuation of ship operations after it was liquidated. Royal Mail Lines Ltd (RML) was created in 1932 and took over the ships of RMSPC and other companies of the former group. The new company was chaired by Lord Essendon.

The new company's operations were concentrated on the west coast of South America, the West Indies and Caribbean, and the Pacific coast of North America; the Southampton – Lisbon – Brazil – Uruguay – Argentina route was operated from 1850 to 1980. RML was also a leading cruise ship operator.

RMS's largest ship was the  turbine steamship . She was designed as an ocean liner but when launched in 1939 was immediately fitted out as a troopship. She finally entered civilian liner service in 1948, was converted to full-time cruising in 1960 and was scrapped in 1971.

RMSP and RML lost a number of ships in their long history. One of the last was the  turbine steamship , which was launched in 1948 and grounded and sank off Brazil on her maiden voyage in 1949.

In 1965 RML was bought by Furness, Withy & Co., and rapidly lost its identity. In the 1970s parts of the Furness Withy Group, including RML, were sold on to Hong Kong shipowner CY Tung, and later sold on to former River Plate rival Hamburg Süd; by the 1990s Royal Mail Lines was no more than the name of a Hamburg-Süd refrigerated cargo service from South America to Europe.

Fleet

List of RMSP Company ships

For conciseness smaller ships such as schooners and lighters are omitted.

List of Royal Mail Lines ships

This list is of the additional ships acquired by RML in addition to those passed directly from RMSP.

See also
See Royal Mail Case for more details on RML's financial situation.

References

Bibliography

External links

1839 establishments in England
1932 establishments in England
British companies established in 1839
British companies established in 1932
Defunct cruise lines
Defunct shipping companies of the United Kingdom
Reefer shipping companies
Transport companies established in 1932
Transport companies established in 1839